This is a list of awards and nominations received by French actress Marion Cotillard. For her portrayal of the title role in the French film Lisa (2001), Cotillard was the winner of Verona Love Screens Film Festival award for Best Actress. She was the winner of Newport Beach Film Festival jury award for Best Actress Drama for Love Me If You Dare in 2004. She has been nominated for numerous awards, including César Award for Most Promising Actress for Taxi (1998) and Pretty Things (2001), and a nod for European Film Award for Best Actress for La Vie en Rose (2007).

Cotillard won a César Award for Best Supporting Actress for A Very Long Engagement (2004). She also won an Academy Award for Best Actress, a Golden Globe Award for Best Actress – Motion Picture Musical or Comedy, a BAFTA Award for Best Actress in a Leading Role, a Satellite Award for Best Actress – Motion Picture Drama and a César Award for Best Actress for her portrayal of Édith Piaf in La Vie en Rose (2007). Cotillard and her co-stars of Nine won a Satellite Award for Best Cast – Motion Picture for their performances in the film.

In 2007, Cotillard received the Academy Award for Best Actress, becoming only the second French cinema actress,  after Simone Signoret in 1959 British film Room at the Top, to win this award and the third overall to receive an Academy Award (Juliette Binoche won the Academy Award for Best Supporting Actress in 1997 for her role in American film The English Patient). Cotillard is the first Best Actress winner in a non-English language performance since Sophia Loren's win in 1961 for Italian film Two Women and also became the first – and so far only – winner of an Academy Award for a performance primarily in the French language.

In 2010, Cotillard was nominated for a Golden Globe Award for Best Actress – Motion Picture Musical or Comedy for Nine (2009). Furthermore, in 2012, Cotillard found herself nominated for her first Drama Golden Globe Award for Best Actress, a second leading actress Screen Actors Guild Award nomination, a second leading actress César Award nomination, a Lumières Award nomination and a Globe de Cristal Award, and Étoile d'Or award for her performance as Stéphanie in Rust and Bone. In 2013, she was named Hasty Pudding Theatricals' Woman of the Year by Harvard's students.

She has also won a Los Angeles Film Critics Association Award for La Vie en Rose and a New York Film Critics Circle Award and a National Society of Film Critics Award for Best Actress for The Immigrant and Two Days, One Night, achieving the critics' awards trifecta. Cotillard, Isabelle Huppert, and Isabelle Adjani are the only French actresses to win the New York Film Critics Circle Award for Best Actress. Adjani won in 1975 for The Story of Adele H., while Cotillard was awarded for her performances in The Immigrant and Two Days, One Night in 2014.

In 2015, Cotillard was nominated for her second Academy Award for Best Actress for her performance in the Belgian film Two Days, One Night, becoming the second French actress to receive two Oscar nominations for French-language films after Isabelle Adjani in 1990, and the fourth actress overall to receive two Academy Award nominations for Best Actress for foreign language films, following Sophia Loren, Liv Ullmann and Adjani.

On July 14, 2016, Cotillard received France's highest honour—she was named a Chevalier (Knight) of the Légion d'Honneur (Legion of Honor).

In 2021, Cotillard received her fourth Golden Globe nomination for her performance in the musical film Annette.

Major associations

Academy Awards

British Academy Film Awards

César Awards

Critics' Choice Movie Awards

European Film Awards

Golden Globe Awards

Screen Actors Guild Awards

Lumières Awards

Film critic awards

Film Festival Awards

Notes

References

External links 
 

Cotillard, Marion